Eparaima Te Mutu Kapa (1842 – 23 October 1924) was a 19th-century Māori member of the New Zealand parliament.

Political career

Kapa, who was from the Aupōuri iwi in Northland, contested and won the 1891 by-election for the seat of Northern Maori. His predecessor, Sydney Taiwhanga, was elected for his second term in the 1890 general election, but died before the election results were announced.

As a member of the 11th New Zealand Parliament, Kapa spoke out in support of women's enfranchisement. He was also a member of the Māori Parliament, and reported to them the proceedings of the New Zealand Parliament.

Kapa contested the seat in the 1893 general election. Despite receiving significant support from women voters (who received voting rights that year), he was defeated by Hone Heke Ngapua. Ngapua also defeated Kapa for the seat in the 1896 and s. and the 

Kapa died at Te Kao on 23 October 1924.

Family
Kapa was an uncle to the Te Aupōuri and Waikato leader Mutu Paratene Kapa.

References

1842 births
1924 deaths
New Zealand MPs for Māori electorates
Members of the New Zealand House of Representatives
Unsuccessful candidates in the 1893 New Zealand general election
Unsuccessful candidates in the 1896 New Zealand general election
Unsuccessful candidates in the 1899 New Zealand general election
19th-century New Zealand politicians